Stephen George Churchett (10 April 1947 – 11 January 2022) was an English actor and writer.

Life and career
One of his most notable roles was as solicitor Marcus Christie in EastEnders, on and off from 1990 to 2004. He reprised the role in 2014 and again in 2015.

He has also appeared in various television programmes, including The Brief, Together, Minder, Campion, Up Pompeii!, Enemy at the Door, Specials, The Professionals, C.A.T.S. Eyes, Lucan, Casualty, Moon and Son, Bugs, The House of Elliot, Peak Practice, Silent Witness, Dangerfield, Pie in the Sky, The Bill, Preston Front, Boon, Monroe, Dalziel and Pascoe and Porkpie. He also appeared in the Doctor Who episode titled Attack of the Cybermen in 1985.

He voiced Wing Commander Belfridge in the 'Allo 'Allo! episode titled "The Sausages in the Trousers". He appeared in various episodes of The Brittas Empire, as Councillor Jack Druggett. He has written episodes of The Bill, Kavanagh QC, Inspector Morse, Dalziel and Pascoe, Monsignor Renard and Hornblower, as well as writing the screenplay for Lewis, and appeared in four Agatha Christie's Marple television adaptations as the Coroner (The Murder at the Vicarage, The Moving Finger, Murder Is Easy, Endless Night). In 1984, he appeared in Miss Marple as Major Reeve in The Body in the Library.

Churchett died on 11 January 2022, at the age of 74.

Partial filmography

Screenplays

References

External links

Cast page at the official EastEnders website

1947 births
2022 deaths
20th-century English male actors
20th-century English male writers
20th-century English writers
21st-century English male actors
21st-century English writers
British male television writers
English male soap opera actors
English television writers
Male actors from London
People from Bromley